Evaristo Prendes (born 23 May 1934) is an Argentine fencer. He competed in the individual and team foil events at the 1968 Summer Olympics.

References

1934 births
Living people
Argentine male fencers
Argentine foil fencers
Olympic fencers of Argentina
Fencers at the 1968 Summer Olympics
Fencers from Buenos Aires
Pan American Games medalists in fencing
Pan American Games gold medalists for Argentina
Fencers at the 1967 Pan American Games
20th-century Argentine people